Gary Levinsohn is an American film producer. He was nominated for the Academy Award for Best Picture, along with Steven Spielberg, Ian Bryce, Mark Gordon for the film Saving Private Ryan. He is the co-owner of Mutual Film Company.

Filmography
He was a producer in all films unless otherwise noted.

Film

Television

Awards and Nominations

In 1999, Gary Levinsohn, along with Steven Spielberg, Ian Bryce and Mark Gordon, was nominated for Academy Award and BAFTA Film Award for Saving Private Ryan, for the category of Best Picture and Best Film respectively. Saving Private Ryan won him Best Drama Picture at 1999 Online Film & Television Association Film Award and 2nd place in Best Motion Picture at Awards Circuit Community Awards. Levinsohn, along with Mark Gordon, Allison Lyon Segan and John Roberts, won BAFTA Children's Award for the film Paulie in the same year. In 2016, Levinsohn, along with Michael Worth, Kassi Crews and Dennis Ho, won an Award of Merit Special Mention at the Accolade Competition for the film Broken Memories.

References

External links

American film producers
Living people
1959 births